Kuhenjan District is a district (bakhsh) in Sarvestan County, Fars Province, Iran. At the 2006 census, its population was 10,724, in 2,628 families.  The District has one city Kuhenjan.  The District has two rural districts (dehestan): Kuhenjan Rural District and Maharlu Rural District.

References 

Sarvestan County
Districts of Fars Province